Ray Malone was a tap dancer and choreographer who appeared in films and television programs. He was a regular on Broadway Open House. He had major roles in the films Slightly Terrific and Moonlight in Vermont. He was also a guest on various shows including a handful of appearances on Dagmar's Canteen as well as on the Garry Moore Show. He performed in the Colgate Comedy Hour in a variety of roles. Jerry Lewis introduced Malone in a performance on the show with Eve Young, who sang "Hello, Young Lovers", followed by Malone in a dance and tap performance.

Malone was a dancer and dance director for the musical "Hugs and Kisses". He recorded an album with street performer Moondog.

References

External links
 
 Video of Eve Young and Ray Malone performing

American tap dancers
Dancers from Texas
Dancers from New York (state)